Nicolas Froment (c. 1435, Uzès, Gard – c. 1486 in Avignon) was a French painter of the Early Renaissance.
Nicolas Froment is one of the most notable representatives of the Second School of Avignon, (École d'Avignon), a group of artists  at the court of the Popes in Avignon, who were located there from 1309 to 1411.

He was influenced by the Flemish style that characterizes the last phase of the Gothic.

He undertook to paint an altarpiece 12 February 1470 in Aix for a rich widow called Catherine Spifami; in the center of the panel is a depicting the Death of Mary, and on the side panels, the Saints Mary Magdalene and Catherine are shown. He was attributed a number of works from this timetime, but none of these attributions can be considered reliable.

One of the most interesting work of this group is the Retable des Pérussis or The Pérussis Altarpiece, depicts the adoration of the empty cross on Golgatha, and is located at the Metropolitan Museum in New York.

Works
 The Resurrection of Lazarus, triptych, (1461), Florence, Galleria degli Uffizi.
 The Matheron Diptych, (v.1475), oil on canvas, 17 x 26 cm, Paris, Musée du Louvre.
 Le Buisson ardent, triptych, (1475-1476), tempera on wood, 410 x 305 cm, Aix-en-Provence,  cathédrale Saint-Sauveur.
 The Legend of Saint Mitre, (about 1470), oil on wood, Aix-en-Provence, cathédrale Saint-Sauveur.

References

See also

Early Renaissance painting

1430s births
1480s deaths
People from Uzès
15th-century French painters
French male painters